Franco Giorgio Cagnotto (born 2 June 1947 in Turin, Piedmont) is a former diver from Italy, who competed in five consecutive Summer Olympics for his native country, starting in 1964.

Biography
Cagnotto's wife Carmen Casteiner and daughter Tania also represented Italy in diving. In 1992, he was inducted in the International Swimming Hall of Fame.

See also
 List of members of the International Swimming Hall of Fame

References

External links

 
 }
 Diving at the Olympics on flipnrip

1947 births
Living people
Sportspeople from Turin
Italian male divers
Olympic divers of Italy
Olympic silver medalists for Italy
Olympic bronze medalists for Italy
Divers at the 1964 Summer Olympics
Divers at the 1968 Summer Olympics
Divers at the 1972 Summer Olympics
Divers at the 1976 Summer Olympics
Divers at the 1980 Summer Olympics
Olympic medalists in diving
Medalists at the 1980 Summer Olympics
Medalists at the 1976 Summer Olympics
Medalists at the 1972 Summer Olympics
World Aquatics Championships medalists in diving